was the eleventh of twenty-four s, built for the Imperial Japanese Navy following World War I. When commissioned, these ships were the most powerful destroyers in the world. They served as first-line destroyers through the 1930s, and remained formidable weapons systems well into the Pacific War.

History
Construction of the advanced Fubuki-class destroyers was authorized as part of the Imperial Japanese Navy's expansion program from fiscal 1923, intended to give Japan a qualitative edge with the world's most modern ships. The Fubuki class drastically improved upon previous destroyer designs; so much so that they were designated . The large size, powerful engines, high speed, large radius of action and unprecedented armament gave these destroyers the firepower similar to many light cruisers in other navies. Ayanami, built at the Fujinagata Shipyards in Osaka was the first in an improved series, which incorporated a modified gun turret which could elevate her main battery of Type 3 127 mm 50 caliber naval guns to 75° as opposed to the original 40°, thus permitting the guns to be used as dual purpose guns against aircraft. Ayanami was the first destroyer in the world with this ability. Ayanami was laid down on 20 January 1928, launched on 5 October 1929 and commissioned on 30 April 1930. Originally assigned hull designation “Destroyer No. 45”, she inherited the name of her predecessor on 1 August before her launch.

The 4th Fleet Incident, which saw major cracks develop in the hulls of several IJN vessels as a result of severe weather, occurred only a year after her commissioning, and Ayanami was quickly taken back to the shipyards for strengthening of her hull.

Operational history
During the Second Sino-Japanese War, from 1937, Ayanami covered landing of Japanese forces in Shanghai and Hangzhou. From 1940, she was assigned to patrol and covered landings of Japanese forces in south China.

World War II history
At the time of the attack on Pearl Harbor, Ayanami was assigned to Destroyer Division 19 of Desron 3 of the IJN 1st Fleet, and had deployed from Kure Naval District to the port of Samah on Hainan Island, escorting Japanese troopships for landing operations in the Battle of Malaya.

In March, Ayanami was assigned to "Operation T" (the invasion of northern Sumatra) and "Operation D", (the invasion of the Andaman Islands). She served patrol and escort duties out of Port Blair during the Japanese raids into the Indian Ocean. On 13–22 April she returned via Singapore and Camranh Bay to Kure Naval Arsenal, for maintenance.

On 4–5 June, Ayanami participated in the Battle of Midway as part of Admiral Isoroku Yamamoto’s main fleet. Ayanami sailed from Amami-Ōshima to Mako Guard District, Singapore, Sabang and Mergui for a projected second Indian Ocean raid. The operation was cancelled due to the Guadalcanal campaign, and Ayanami was ordered to Truk instead, arriving in late August.  During the Battle of the Eastern Solomons on 24 August Ayanami escorted the fleet supply group to Guadalcanal. She was assigned to numerous "Tokyo Express" transport missions to various locations in the Solomon Islands in October and November.

Ayanami'''s final mission, on November 14–15, 1942, was that of the Second Naval Battle of Guadalcanal. There, she was attached to a scouting force under the command of Rear Admiral Shintarō Hashimoto in the light cruiser . When American Admiral Willis A. Lee's Task Force 64 was spotted near Savo Island, Hashimoto took his ships clockwise around the island, but sent Ayanami alone in the opposite direction sweeping for enemy vessels. When Lee's ships were located, the order to attack was given, and as such, Ayanami became one of three prongs in the initial attack (Along with Hashimoto's group, and another group led by Rear Admiral Susumu Kimura in the light cruiser ).Ayanami was first sighted by the American destroyer , but the light cruiser Nagara was located soon after and the four destroyers' attentions shifted to it. Torpedo and shellfire from Ayanami, Nagara, and Uranami sank two of the four destroyers ( and USS Walke), mortally wounded  (which was scuttled after the battle), and severely damaged , causing heavy American losses in the first phase of the battle.

Lee's  then sighted Ayanami and shelled her. The Japanese destroyer sustained critical damage and 27 of her crew were killed; she fired one shell, which missed Washington. Thirty surviving crew members including Commander Sakuma escaped in a boat to Guadalcanal; the remainder were taken off by Uranami. At the same time Washington crippled and sank the battleship . Later in the night Uranami scuttled the abandoned Ayanami with a single torpedo, and she sank soon after 02:00.  Her wreck remains at the bottom of Ironbottom Sound.

On 15 December 1942, Ayanami was removed from the navy list.

The wreck
In late July 1992 marine archeologist Robert Ballard led an expedition to Ironbottom Sound, finding thirteen newly discovered shipwrecks. Among these new finds were the remains of Ayanami''. The hull and keel of the ship appear to have been broken by a starboard torpedo blast just behind the bridge; the ship came to rest in two pieces, with the stern upright, and the bow twisted and lying on its starboard side.

Notes

References

External links

Ayanami in Naval History of World Wars
Located/Surveyed Shipwrecks of the Imperial Japanese Navy

Fubuki-class destroyers
1929 ships
Second Sino-Japanese War naval ships of Japan
World War II destroyers of Japan
Shipwrecks in Ironbottom Sound
Maritime incidents in November 1942
Ships built by Fujinagata Shipyards
1992 archaeological discoveries
Scuttled vessels